NGC 7583 is a lenticular galaxy located in the constellation Pisces. It was discovered on September 2, 1864 by the astronomer Albert Marth.

See also
 
 List of largest galaxies
 List of nearest galaxies

References

External links 
 

Pisces (constellation)
7583
Lenticular galaxies